The 2019 Scottish Open (known as the 19.com Scottish Open due to sponsorship) was a professional snooker tournament, which took place from 9 to 15 December 2019 at the Emirates Arena in Glasgow, Scotland. It was the eighth ranking event of the 2019–20 snooker season and the third tournament of the Home Nations Series. The event featured a prize fund of £405,000, with the winner receiving £70,000, and was sponsored by sports bookmakers 19.com. The tournament was broadcast across Europe on Eurosport.

The defending champion was Mark Allen who completed a 9–7 defeat of Shaun Murphy in the 2018 final, but he lost 5–6 to Jack Lisowski in the semi-finals. The final was contested between Mark Selby and Lisowski. Selby claimed his 17th ranking title and became the first player to win two Home Nations events in a single season after a 9–6 victory over Lisowski in the final. Lisowski made the highest  of the event, a 143, in frame three of his quarter-final win over Thepchaiya Un-Nooh.

Format
The Scottish Open was first played in 1981 as the 1981 International Open, which was won by Steve Davis. The event was added to the Home Nations Series in 2016. The 2019 edition was the third of four Home Nations Series tournaments, and the eighth world ranking event of the 2019–20 snooker season. The event took place from 9 to 15 December 2019 at the Emirates Arena in Glasgow, Scotland. It followed the UK Championship, and preceded the European Masters.

The defending champion was Mark Allen, who had won the 2018 event by defeating Shaun Murphy 9–7. All matches were played as the best of 7  in the first four rounds, at which point the number increased: 9 in the quarter-finals; 11 in the semi-finals; and the best of 19 frames in the final. Chinese sports prediction website 19.com sponsored the event, which was broadcast in Europe by Eurosport; Quest in the United Kingdom and Northern Ireland; NowTV in Hong Kong; Superstars Online, Youku and Zhibo.tv in China; DAZN in Canada and Sky Sport in New Zealand.

Prize fund
The winner of the event received £70,000 of a total prize fund of £405,000. A breakdown of the prize money for the event is shown below:

 Winner: £70,000
 Runner-up: £30,000
 Semi-final: £20,000
 Quarter-final: £10,000
 Last 16: £7,500
 Last 32: £4,000
 Last 64: £3,000
 Highest break: £5,000
 Total: £405,000

Summary
The first four rounds were played between 9 and 12 December as the best-of-7 frame matches. Defending champion Mark Allen defeated Andy Hicks 4–2 and then Louis Heathcote, Elliot Slessor and Chris Wakelin all 4–1. He would play 25th seed Scott Donaldson, who defeated Lei Peifan, Billy Joe Castle, eighth seed Kyren Wilson, and Zhang Jiankang all by four frames to two. Twelfth seed Jack Lisowski overcame Zhang Anda, David Grace, Mike Dunn, and fifth seed John Higgins to reach the last eight stage. He met Thepchaiya Un-Nooh, who beat Liang Wenbo, Robert Milkins, Marco Fu, before whitewashing fourth seed Neil Robertson 4–0. Third seed Ronnie O'Sullivan defeated Dominic Dale on a deciding frame, before completing whitewashes over James Cahill and Martin Gould, and reaching the quarter-finals with a 4–2 win over Joe Perry. Sixth seed Mark Selby won in the first round over Mark Joyce and Alfie Burden before completing 4–0 whitewashes of his own over Liam Highfield and Jimmy Robertson. The final quarter-final was to be played between David Gilbert – who completed victories over Eden Sharav, Chang Bingyu, Xiao Guodong and Shaun Murphy – and second seed Judd Trump, who completed 4–0 victories over Amine Amiri and Yuan Sijun before 4–1 defeating James Wattana and Graeme Dott.

The quarter-finals of the event were played on 13 December as the best of nine frame matches. Allen defeated Donaldson 5–1, making four breaks over 50. O'Sullivan led Selby 4–3, with four century breaks being made between them in the opening five frames. Selby made a break of 56 to force a deciding frame, which he won with a break of 63. Gilbert lost the opening frame against Trump, but won the next three with breaks of 71 and 98. Trump won frame five with a break of 101, but Gilbert won the next two frames to progress after a 5–2 victory. The final quarter-final was played between Lisowski and Un-Nooh. Lisowski made breaks of 63, 76, 78, 71 and the tournament high break of 143 to win the match 5–3. The match was described by Lisowski as "probably the best game I’ve ever been involved in as a professional".

The semi-finals were held on 14 December as the best of 11 frames. Selby defeated Gilbert by six frames to one, with breaks of 76, 84, 132 and 69. Allen and Lisowski in the second semi-final were tied at 2–2, before Allen won frame five with a break of 79. Lisowski won the next three frames, including a 74 in frame 8 which was described by Eurosport pundit Neal Foulds as "good a break as we have seen all year". Allen, however won the next two frames to force a deciding frame, which was won by Liswoski, with a 95 break.

The final was contested between Selby and Lisowski on 15 December as the best of 17 frames, held over two . The pair had met on the world snooker tour on seven previous occasions, with Liwowski having won four of their encounters. Selby tied the scores at 2–2 with breaks of 78 and 75. Lisowski took frame five, before Selby won frame six with a break of 127, and led at 5–3 after winning the next two frames. On the resumption of the match, Lisowski won two of the next three frames before Selby took frame 12 after a prolonged . The next frame was won by Selby, who led 8–5, one frame from victory, but lost frame 14 despite being 64 points ahead. Selby, however, won the match 9–6 in frame 15 after a break of 79. After the victory, Selby commented that after losing to Matthew Stevens in the UK Championship, he had thought about retiring from the event. This was Selby's second Home Nations victory of the season and his 17th career ranking title.

Tournament draw
Below is the full results for the events. Players in bold denote match winners, whilst numbers in brackets show seedings.

Top half

Section 1

Section 2

Section 3

Section 4

Bottom half

Section 5

Section 6

Section 7

Section 8

Finals

Final

Century breaks
There were a total of 80 century breaks made during the tournament. The highest was a 143 made by Lisowski in frame three of his quarter-final win.

 143, 135, 124, 119, 118, 100  Jack Lisowski
 142, 124, 108, 100  David Gilbert
 139, 100  Joe Perry
 137, 125  Graeme Dott
 136, 101  Yan Bingtao
 135, 132, 120, 117  Mark Selby
 134, 132, 128  Chris Wakelin
 132, 118, 104, 100  Ding Junhui
 132, 102  Kyren Wilson
 129, 124, 123, 105  Liam Highfield
 129, 106  Ryan Day
 128, 109, 108, 103  Xiao Guodong
 128  Robert Milkins
 127  Kurt Maflin
 126, 100  Stephen Maguire
 124, 121, 104, 102  Mark Allen
 124  Adam Stefanow
 123, 113, 111, 111, 110, 109, 106  Ronnie O'Sullivan
 123, 109  John Higgins
 120  Chen Feilong
 119, 104  Marco Fu
 119  Lu Ning
 119  Hossein Vafaei
 118, 101  Gary Wilson
 118  Ali Carter
 115, 112  Yuan Sijun
 115  Sam Baird
 114  Thepchaiya Un-Nooh
 112  Matthew Stevens
 111, 102, 101  Judd Trump
 106  Stuart Carrington
 105, 102  Neil Robertson
 105  Jimmy Robertson
 103  Chen Zifan
 103  Tom Ford
 101  Luca Brecel

References

Home Nations Series
2019
2019 in snooker
2019 in Scottish sport
2019
2010s in Glasgow
December 2019 sports events in the United Kingdom